John Óge Lynch fitz Stephen, Mayor of Galway 1552-53.

Information
Lynch was elected mayor in August 1552 and sworn into office in September. He passed into town law a statute ordering that no person could approach any child or apprentice with a contract of work without first approaching the child's father or guardians.

References

Notes
 History of Galway, James Hardiman, Galway, 1820.
 Old Galway, Maureen Donovan O'Sullivan, 1942.
 Henry, William (2002). Role of Honour: The Mayors of Galway City 1485-2001. Galway: Galway City Council.  
 Martyn, Adrian (2016). The Tribes of Galway: 1124-1642

Mayors of Galway
16th-century Irish politicians